The African Table tennis Championships is a tournament organized by the African Table Tennis Federation (ATTF) to crown the best Table tennis players in Africa. For the Team event there is the African Table tennis Team Championships. This is not to be confused with the African Games, the multi sports event, held every four years where Table tennis is included since 1973.

Previous winners

Note.
ITTF Africa Cup is different

References

External links
African Table Tennis Federation (ATTF)
2018 African Championships
results.ittf.bornan.net
www.ittfafrica.com

Table tennis Championships
Table tennis in Africa
Recurring sporting events established in 1962